This is a list of people elected Fellow of the Royal Society in 1923.

Fellows

Edgar Douglas Adrian, 1st Baron Adrian of Cambridge
William Lawrence Balls
Archibald Barr
Cecil Henry Desch
Edward Fawcett
Frank Horton
Robert Thomson Leiper
John James Rickard Macleod
Sir Guy Anstruther Knox Marshall
Sir Douglas Mawson
James William McBain
William Hobson Mills
John Stanley Plaskett
Henry Richardson Procter
William Wilson

1923
1923 in the United Kingdom
1923 in science